Anasa scorbutica is a species of leaf-footed bug in the family Coreidae. It is found in the Caribbean Sea, Central America, North America, South America, and the Caribbean.

References

Further reading

 

Articles created by Qbugbot
Insects described in 1775
Taxa named by Johan Christian Fabricius
Coreini